Rodney Gehan (12 November 1942 – 8 February 2001) was an Australian cricketer. He played in one first-class match for South Australia in 1962/63.

See also
 List of South Australian representative cricketers

References

External links
 

1942 births
2001 deaths
Australian cricketers
South Australia cricketers
Cricketers from Melbourne
People from Werribee, Victoria